The 2021 Swedish speedway season was the 2021 season of motorcycle speedway in Sweden.

Individual

Individual Championship
The 2021 Swedish Individual Speedway Championship final was held at the Skrotfrag Arena in Målilla on 13 July 2021. 

The title was won by Freddie Lindgren for the second time.

U21 Championship
 
Winner - Gustav Grahn

Team

Team Championship
Dackarna won the Elitserien.

Indianerna B won the Allsvenskan (second tier league).

Play offs

References 

Speedway competitions in Sweden
Speedway leagues
Professional sports leagues in Sweden
Swedish
speedway
Seasons in Swedish speedway